Kuyūthā is the cosmic bull in medieval Islamic cosmography. It is said to carry on its back the angel who shoulders the earth and the rock platform upon which the angel stands. The bull is said to stand on the giant fish or whale, Bahamut.

The bull is variously described as having 40,000 horns and legs, or as many eyes, ears, mouths and tongues in the oldest sources. The number of appendages can vary in later versions. Its breathing is said to control the tides of the ocean.

Kīyūbān or Kibūthān also appear in printed editions of Qazwini's cosmography. These have been claimed to be corruptions of Leviathan. Alternate names include Al-Rayann.

Kuyootà, Kuyoothán were forms of the name as transcribed by Edward Lane, and given as Kuyata (Spanish), Kujata (first English translation, 1969), and Quyata (revised English translation) in various editions of Jorge Luis Borges's Book of Imaginary Beings.

Orthography

"Kuyootà" was Edward Lane's transcription of the beast's name according to an Arabic source not clearly specified. This became "Kuyata" in Jorge Luis Borges's El libro de los seres imaginarios (originally published as Manual de zoología fantástica, 1957). Then in its first English translation Book of Imaginary Beings (1969) it was further changed to "Kujata", and then to "Quyata" (in the 2005 translation).

Kuyūta is yet another spelling in print, re-transcribed from Lane. Kujūta was given by Thomas Patrick Hughes's Dictionary of Islam.

"Kuyūthā" appears  in a copy of al-Qazwini's cosmography and as "Kīyūbān or Kibūthān" in Wüstenfeld's 1859 printed edition of al-Qazwini. These names are said to be corrupted text, and have been emended to "Leviat[h]an", by German translator Hermann Ethé.

"Kuyoothán" is an alternate spelling from the source Lane identifies as Ibn-Esh-Shiḥneh, which was some manuscript Lane had in his possession.

Rakaboûnâ is one variant name for the bull, as read from some manuscript of Al-Damiri (d. 1405) by French Dr. Nicolas Perron, though the original text has al-thawr Kuyūtha ('the bull Kuyūtha'. Cairo ed. of 1819) Al-Rayann is the name of the bull as it appears in Muḥammad al-Kisāʾī (ca. 1100)'s version of the Qiṣaṣ al-Anbiyā’ ("Tales of the Prophets"). A reshaping of its nature must have occurred in Arab storytelling, some time in the pre-Islamic period. One proposed scenario is that a pair of beasts from the bible were confused with each other; the behemoth mis-assigned to the fish, and the aquatic leviathan to the bull.

Derivation
Lūyātān was the bull's reconstructed correct name in Arabic according Hermann Ethé's notes. Accordingly, he translates the bull's name as Leviathan in his German translation of Qazwini.

Other commentators such as  have also stated that the bull derived from the biblical Leviathan, much as the name of the Islamic cosmic fish Bahamut derived from the biblical Behemoth.

Lane's summary

Borges relied on Islamic traditional cosmography as summarized by Edward Lane in Arabian Society in the Middle Ages (1883).

Lane's summary of Arabic source explains that "Kuyootà" was the name of the bull created by God to hold up a rock of "ruby", on which stood an earth-propping angel. God created the angel, rock, then the bull in that order according to this source, then a giant fish called Bahamut to sustain the bull underneath. Before this, the earth was oscillating in wayward directions, and all these layers of support were needed to achieve stability.

The bull had 4,000 eyes, ears, noses, mouths, tougues, feet, according to Lane's summary, but the number is 40,000 eyes, limbs, etc. in several (older) Islamic sources, as discussed below.

Arabic sources

Kuyūthā is the name of the bull in the text of al-Qazwini (d. 1283)'s popular cosmography, The Wonders of Creation. This approximates Lane's spelling "Kuyootà". There exist a multitude of "editions" and manuscripts of al-Qazwini, which vary widely.

Al-Damiri (d. 1405) on authority of Wahb ibn Munabbih, is one source he specifically named as being used by Lane, in his summary. This so-called al-Damiri's account is considered to be a mere later redaction of al-Qazwini's cosmography printed on the margins, and it may be noted that in Qazwini's account, Wahb ibn Munabbih acts as narrator. A translation of Al-Damiri into French was undertaken by Nicolas Perron. The bull's name was however "Rakaboûnâ" (Rakabūnā) in al-Damiri, according to Perron's translation.

The name of the bull is wanting in Yaqut al-Hamawi (d. 1229)'s geography, Mu'jam al-Buldan. Yaqut is thought to have borrowed from al-Tha'labi (d. 1038)’s Qiṣaṣ al-anbīyāʾ ("Lives of the Prophets"), one of the two earliest sources containing the cosmology.

Ibn al-Wardi (d. 1348) (Kharīdat al-ʿAjā'ib, "The Pearl of Wonders"), considered to be a derivative rearrangement of Yaqut, is an alternate source used by Lane who noted variant readings from it.

Number of appendages
The bull has 4,000 legs in al-Damiri (d. 1405). But in Qazwini (d. 1283), the bull has 40,000 eyes, etc., with "teeth" replace "tongues" in Lane's list. The larger number repeats what is found in older texts: "40,000 horns and 40,000 limbs" according to Yaqut (d. 1229)'s geography, 70,000 horns and 40,000 legs according to al-Tha'labi (d. 1038)’s Lives and 40,000 eyes, ears, mouths and tongues according to Muḥammad al-Kisāʾī's Lives of the Prophets.

The bull has 40 humps, 40 horns, and four feet according to Ibn al-Wardi (d. 1348) in another passage, (although in the corresponding passage he merely repeats Yaqut's 40,000 horns and feet).

Its horns extended from the earth to God's Throne (ʿarš), entangling it or lying like a "prickly hedge" underneath.

Gem rock above bull
As for the rock platform supported by the bull, which Lane said was made of "ruby", the Arabic word used in original sources yāqūt has ambiguous meaning. Many of the Islamic sources have specifically indicated the rock was a green gem, viz.: "rock (made) of green jacinth", "green rock", "green corundum", etc. It is given as "green emerald" in a Latin translation of ibn al-Wardi.

God created the angel, rock, then bull in that order (the order they are arranged, one on top of another), according to Qazwini. However, in other sources, God created in the order of angel then bull, so that the angel could stand on the bull's hump, but as this was unstable, God inserted the rock platform above the bull's hump. These sources also say that God also inserted a sandhill between the great bull and the great fish.

Bull controlling tides

The bull's breathing is said to control the ocean tides according to some sources. Among the oldest sources (al-Tha'labi), the bull (ox) had its nose in the sea, and breathed once a day, causing the sea to rise when it exhaled, and ebb when it inhaled. The bull had its two nostrils pinned against two holes in the "green corundum" enabling it to breathe (Yaqut).

On a related natural phenomenon, the bull and fish were considered responsible for drinking the water that tapped off from the land into the sea, maintaining the base level of the ocean's water. However, once their bellies become full they will become agitated (Ibn al-Wardi), and it is a sign of the advent of Judgment Day (Yaqut).

See also
 Gavaevodata
Atlas (mythology)
Tur (Bosnian-Slavic mythology)
Turtles all the way down

External links 
  and "Etymology Corner: A Lot of Bull"

Explanatory notes

References

Bibliography

(primary sources)

 
 ʿAjā'ib al-makhlūqāt wa gharā'ib al-mawjūdāt (عجائب المخلوقات و غرائب الموجودات),  plain text redaction 
 

; translation 

(secondary sources)
 

Arabian mythology
Mythological bovines
Mythological bulls
World-bearing animals
Arabian legendary creatures